Edward Hewish Ryle (1 October   1885 – 5 April 1952) was a British track and field athlete competing in the 400 metres. Born in Cambridge, he competed at the 1908 Summer Olympics in London. His talent for running was discovered while he attended Cambridge University.

Montague won his preliminary heat in the 400 metres in a walkover.  He placed third in his semifinal to be eliminated from competition.

References

 
 
 

1885 births
1952 deaths
British male sprinters
English male sprinters
Athletes (track and field) at the 1908 Summer Olympics
Olympic athletes of Great Britain
Sportspeople from Cambridge
Alumni of the University of Cambridge